Peter Anyang' Nyong'o (born 10 October 1943) is a Kenyan politician and author who is the Governor of Kisumu County. He is a former Secretary-General of Orange Democratic Movement (the current Secretary-General is Edwin Sifuna). Professor Nyong'o was the acting party leader from March 11 until late May when Raila Odinga was in the United States and was elected to the National Assembly of Kenya in the December 2007 parliamentary election, representing the Kisumu Rural Constituency. He was the Minister for Medical Services and previously the Minister for Planning & National Development. He previously served as the Senator of Kisumu from 2013 to 2017.

Life and career
Nyong'o was born in Ratta, Kisumu, British Kenya. He completed his undergraduate studies at Uganda's Makerere University, where he was awarded a first class honours degree in political science. He Served as Guild  president of Makerere in 1969/70. He thereafter proceeded to his graduate and postgraduate studies at the University of Chicago, where he obtained an MA and a PhD in political science in 1977.

Nyong'o took teaching positions at the University of Nairobi, where he was a professor of political science and a visiting professor in universities in Mexico and Addis Ababa, where he served until 1987, before taking up the position of head of programs at the African Academy of Sciences.

He was a member of the Kenyan Senate representing Kisumu County from March 4, 2013 to August 8, 2017 having been elected on an ODM (Orange Democratic Movement) Party ticket. He is a former Member of Parliament for Kisumu Rural constituency, having been elected on a NARC ticket in the December 2002. His political career dates back to 1992, when he was first elected to parliament. He served as a nominated MP from 1998 to 2002. From 2003 to 2005, Nyong'o served as the Minister for Planning and National Development, and from 2008 to 2013 he was the Minister for Medical Services.

He is credited for actively engaging in the movement for Kenya's second liberation during the previous KANU regime. For his contribution to scholarship and democratization, Nyong'o received a German-African Award in 1995.

From October to December 2013, Nyong'o was a Brundtland Senior Leadership Fellow at the Harvard T.H. Chan School of Public Health. In this role, he taught a course in the Department of Global Health and Population titled "Leadership Development in Global Health and Policy-Making in Kenya: The Case of Four Parastatals."

His children are Academy Award winning actress Lupita Nyong'o, fashion designer Fiona Nyong'o, Esperanza Wamoni Nyong'o, businesswoman Zawadi Nyong'o, and Peter Nyong'o, who plays soccer as a goalkeeper.

References

External links
Peter Anyang’ Nyong’o

Members of the National Assembly (Kenya)
Living people
Members of the Senate of Kenya
Orange Democratic Movement politicians
Government ministers of Kenya
Makerere University alumni
University of Chicago alumni
Kenyan Luo people
1945 births
Kenyan Luo politicians
People from Kisumu County
Fellows of the African Academy of Sciences